A. M. A. Hamid was a Member of the National Assembly of Pakistan representing East Bengal.

Career 
Hamid was elected to the 1st National Assembly of Pakistan from East Pakistan as a Muslim candidate in 1947.

Hamid spoke against the allegation of violence against Hindu minorities by congress members of Parliaments from East Pakistan. He stated that Hindu businessmen were taking away capital and machineries from East Bengal to India.

References 

Pakistani MNAs 1947–1954

People from Pabna District